is a Japanese figure skater. She is the 2005 Four Continents silver medalist and 2001-2002 bronze medalist.

Career 
Onda started taking skating lessons at the age of eight.

Onda became the first Japanese female figure skater to win a Grand Prix series title when she won the Bofrost Cup on Ice in Gelsenkirchen, Germany in 2002. She also won the NHK Trophy that same season. Throughout her career, Onda attempted to land a triple axel in her programs, but never did so successfully.

Onda hoped to end her career by skating at the 2007 World Championships but failed to qualify for the event at the Japanese Nationals. During her competitive career, her coaches were Josée Chouinard, Audrey Weisiger and Machiko Yamada. Onda retired from competition in 2007. She performed with Prince Ice World and then began coaching in Nagoya.

Programs

Results

References

External links

 
 yoshieonda.com - Fan page

1982 births
Living people
Japanese female single skaters
Figure skaters at the 2002 Winter Olympics
Olympic figure skaters of Japan
Figure skaters from Nagoya
Four Continents Figure Skating Championships medalists
Universiade medalists in figure skating
Universiade gold medalists for Japan
Competitors at the 2005 Winter Universiade